Phaeosperma is a genus of fungi in the class Dothideomycetes. The relationship of this taxon to other taxa within the class is unknown (incertae sedis). Also, the placement of this genus within the Dothideomycetes is uncertain.

Species 

Phaeosperma ailanthi
Phaeosperma boehmeriae
Phaeosperma cariei
Phaeosperma dryophilum
Phaeosperma fennica
Phaeosperma foeniculinum
Phaeosperma gilliesi
Phaeosperma helvetica
Phaeosperma leptosporum
Phaeosperma microspora
Phaeosperma saccardoanum
Phaeosperma sarrazinianum
Phaeosperma valdiviense

See also 
 List of Dothideomycetes genera incertae sedis

References

External links 
 Phaeosperma at Index Fungorum

Dothideomycetes enigmatic taxa
Dothideomycetes genera